Second civil war, Second Civil War, or civil war II may refer to

Historical wars
 Second English Civil War (1648–1649)
 Second Congo War (1998–2002), also referred to as a civil war
 Second Liberian Civil War (1999–2003)
 Second Sudanese Civil War (1983–2005)

Fictional or hypothetical wars
 Second American Civil War – hypothetical event predicted in various writings 
 The Second Civil War, 1997 made-for-television film
 Civil War II, a Marvel Comics comic book crossover storyline

See also
 First Civil War (disambiguation)
 Civil War (disambiguation)